Mark Stephen Brown (born 28 February 1963) is a Cook Islands politician and Prime Minister of the Cook Islands. He had previously served as Deputy Prime Minister under Henry Puna. He is a member of the Cook Islands Party.

Early life
Brown was born in 1963 in Avarua on Rarotonga, and educated at Nikao Maori School, Nikao Side School, Tereora College and Gisborne Boys' High School in New Zealand. He holds a Diploma in Public Sector Management from Massey University in New Zealand and a Masters in Business Administration from the University of the South Pacific. He has worked as a public servant, including as a policy advisor for the Prime Minister's Office and as head of the Ministry of Agriculture, and as a property developer. He has served as Vice-President of the Cook Islands Chamber of Commerce, and President of the Cook Islands Touch Association.

Political career
Brown is currently vice-president of the CIP. He unsuccessfully contested the electorate of Takuvaine–Tutakimoa in the 2006 elections, but was elected at the 2010 election.

Brown was appointed to Cabinet in December 2010 as finance minister. He was re-elected at the 2014 election, and again in 2018. Following the 2018 election he was appointed Deputy Prime Minister, replacing Teariki Heather.

In December 2019 a private prosecution for fraud was lodged against Brown and Prime Minister Henry Puna, alleging that a government-chartered aircraft had been misused. In March 2021 the charges were dismissed by the High Court.

In June 2020 Prime Minister Henry Puna announced his intention to stand down in September in order to compete for the role of Secretary-General of the Pacific Islands Forum. He nominated Brown as his replacement. On 1 October, following the retirement of Henry Puna, he was elected Prime Minister. He retained almost all of his and Puna's portfolios in his initial Cabinet, surrendering only Education and Tourism to other Ministers. He plans to re-allocate major portfolios such as Finance and Foreign Affairs to other Ministers in 2021.

In mid-December 2020, Prime Minister Brown and his New Zealand counterpart Jacinda Ardern announced that a travel bubble between New Zealand and the Cook Islands would be established next year, facilitating two-way quarantine-free travel between the two countries.

A cabinet reshuffle on 2 June 2021 saw him distribute half his portfolios to other Ministers.

He was re-elected at the 2022 election and reappointed Prime Minister after securing the support of two independents.

References

1963 births
Living people
Members of the Parliament of the Cook Islands
Cook Islands Party politicians
Finance ministers of the Cook Islands
Sports ministers of the Cook Islands 
Deputy Prime Ministers of the Cook Islands
Prime Ministers of the Cook Islands
People from Rarotonga
University of the South Pacific alumni
Massey University alumni